Platinum(II) acetate is a purple-colored coordination complex. The complex adopts an unusual structure consisting of a square array of Pt atoms.

Preparation
Several syntheses of platinum(II) acetate have been reported. Geoffrey Wilkinson et al. reported a synthesis from sodium hexahydroxyplatinate, nitric acid, and acetic acid. This intermediate solution was reducted with formic acid. The procedure is not highly reproducible.

Alternatively, the complex can be prepared by the reaction of silver acetate with platinum(II) chloride.

Structure 
According to X-ray crystallography, the complex is tetrameric, in contrast to the trimeric palladium analog. The four platinum atoms form a square cluster, with eight bridging acetate ligands surrounding them. The compound has slight distortions from idealized D2d symmetry. The crystal is tetragonal.

References

Coordination complexes
Acetate,2
Acetates